Domaine Montrose is a Côtes de Thongue appellation French wine estate founded in the South of France in  1701.
It is  named for its location on a volcano (mont) and the pink (rose) almond tree flowers that surround the vineyards.
The vineyard is 100 hectares (1 km2). Family owned since its founding in 1701, Bernard Coste represents the 11th family generation at the  Domaine; his son Olivier joined him in 2009. 

The Domaine's typical rosé wine blend is 65% grenache, 25% cabernet sauvignon, and 10% syrah.
Its typical red wine blend is 35% merlot, 35% syrah, and 30% grenache. Its grand vin is Salamandre, of which only 7,000 bottles are produced per year; it is 60% cabernet sauvignon and 40% syrah.

Wine criticism 
Wine Enthusiast rated the Domaine Montrose 2013 Rosé at 87 points, and the Domaine Montrose 2016 Rosé at 86 points.

See also
The Liv-ex Bordeaux Classification

References

1701 establishments in France
French wine